Devon Alexander (born February 10, 1987) is an American professional boxer. He is a former world champion in two weight classes, having held the unified WBC and IBF light welterweight titles in 2010, and the IBF welterweight title from 2012 to 2013. Alexander was prescribed Tramadol after surgery in 2012, and thereafter had to battle opiate addiction, coming clean in 2018.

Early life
Alexander grew up in the Hyde Park neighborhood of north St. Louis, Missouri in an area described as rough, gang- and drug-infested. He would later join the boxing gym that Kevin Cunningham, a former police officer and security officer at Clay Community Center, turned trainer, founded in the basement of an old police station.

Thirty youngsters joined the boxing program of Cunningham, who had hoped to keep them out of trouble, off the streets, and in the ring. A stablemate of Alexander's, Cory Spinks would later become welterweight champion.

Amateur career
Alexander had an outstanding amateur career, compiling a record of 300-10 under the tutelage of Cunningham. He was a four-time Silver Gloves champion from ages 10–14; three-time PAL national champion; Junior Golden Gloves and Junior Olympics national champion; 2003 United States national champion in the 19-and-under division; and 2004 United States light welterweight national champion. Alexander made it to the final round of the 2004 Olympic trials, where he battled Rock Allen to a draw and was knocked down once before losing on a tie-breaker.

Professional career

Light welterweight
At age 17, Alexander made his professional debut, defeating Vincent Torres by first round technical knockout in Sault Sainte Marie, Michigan.

He went up against former WBO junior welterweight champion DeMarcus Corley on January 19, 2008, at Madison Square Garden in New York City. Alexander easily defeated Corley by unanimous decision.

Light welterweight title
On August 1, 2009, Alexander defeated Junior Witter to claim the vacant WBC light welterweight championship. Witter gave up on his stool after the eighth round, claiming that he had re-injured his left hand. Alexander was hurt by a right hand in round 2. All three judges had Alexander ahead at the time of the stoppage 79-73, 79-73, 80-72.

Alexander vs. Urango
Alexander was next scheduled to face two-time champion Juan Urango of Colombia in a title unification bout. March 6, 2010 bout was held at the Mohegan Sun in Uncasville, Connecticut and was televised on HBO's "Boxing After Dark" telecast. To train for the fight, Alexander used a Las Vegas house lent by promoter Don King as training base.  Devon Alexander defeated Juan Urango by TKO in round 8.
Alexander threw an uppercut which dropped Urango. Urango made the count but Alexander resumed his attack and threw a hook to Urango's temple which again dropped him. Urango stood up but was clearly dazed, resulting in a stoppage by the referee. Urango, who suffered his first KO defeat, called out Timothy Bradley after the fight, but a fight was never made because Bradley just moved up to welterweight.

In his next fight he faced Andreas Kotelnik, the former WBA Light Welterweight champion, in his hometown of St. Louis Missouri on August 7 in front of members of the St. Louis Rams, Evander Holyfield and Floyd Mayweather. Alexander won the fight by a controversial unanimous decision with all judges scoring the fight 116-112.

On October 22, 2010, Alexander was stripped of the IBF Junior Welterweight title for not fighting the no. 1 contender, Kaizer Mabuza.

Alexander vs. Bradley

Alexander's next fight, on January 29, 2011, took place against Timothy Bradley, which he lost via 10th round TD after an unintentional head-butt forced a stop to the bout.

Alexander vs. Matthysse
On June 25, 2011, Alexander defeated Lucas Matthysse in a controversial split decision. The judges scored the fight 96-93 and 95-94 for Alexander and 96-93 for Matthysse.

Welterweight
On February 25, 2012 Alexander moved up to welterweight and put on a dominating performance against highly regarded and hard-charging Marcos Maidana. Alexander landed the right hook at will, catching Maidana with his left hand down throughout the contest. Maidana was seemingly surprised by both the speed and power Alexander displayed at his first fight at welterweight. Only one of the three judges had Maidana winning a round. The impressive nature of the win earned Alexander a title match with Randall Bailey in September 2012. Alexander was criticized by some however, for fighting illegally at some points during the fight.

Alexander was scheduled to fight titlest Randall Bailey as a main event on Showtime Championship Boxing on September 8, 2012, but Bailey withdrew due to injury. Their fight was replaced with the original undercard fight between Olusegun Ajose and Lucas Matthysse and an originally scheduled non-televised fight between J'Leon Love and Ramon Valenzuela was changed to a televised bout.

IBF welterweight champion
Alexander returned to action on October 20, 2012, at the Barclays Center in Brooklyn, where he won the IBF Welterweight title by unanimous decision against Ring Top 10 Welterweight, Randall Bailey. The fight was fought at a comfortable pace for Alexander, with very little exchanges, as Bailey did not let his hands go very often. In a one sided fight, Alexander won his third world title in his second division.

Alexander vs. Brook cancellation
Alexander's next fight was originally supposed to happen on January 19, 2013 at the Nokia Theatre in Los Angeles, California, against mandatory challenger and Ring No. 3 ranked Welterweight, Kell Brook. However, Brook suffered an ankle injury during training, and the fight was postponed for Feb 23rd with the fight taking place in Detroit, where undercard fighter Cornelius Bundrage would be a big draw. There were many venues up for consideration ranging from The Royal Oak Music Theater to The Joe Louis Arena, with the decision finally landing to the theater at Masonic Temple in Detroit, Michigan. Before the fight, this time Alexander suffered an injury from his bicep during training rescheduling the fight yet again for May 18, 2013 at the Boardwalk Hall In Atlantic City, New Jersey. Brook would later withdraw from the fight due to a foot injury, calling the fight off for a third time. Alexander would defend his title against replacement Lee Purdy with Purdy retiring on the stool in the end of the seventh round. Devon won easily but hurt his left hand.

Devon would go on to lose his next two biggest fights, losing his championship belt and status as a top contender after all boxing governing bodies removed Devon Alexander from their top rankings.

Shawn Porter loss
Alexander would lose the IBF Welterweight title to Shawn Porter on December 7, 2013 by unanimous decision with scores of 115-113, 116-112 and 116-112.

Alexander vs. Khan
Alexander lost  the WBC Silver Welterweight title to Amir Khan on December 13, 2014 by a lopsided unanimous decision with scores of 119-109, 118-110, 120-108.

Alexander vs. Martinez
Alexander took on gate keeper Aaron Martinez on October 14, 2015 and was dominated through 10 rounds, en route to ultimately losing a unanimous decision.

Alexander vs. Ortiz 
On February 17, 2018, Alexander faced Victor Ortiz. Alexander started the fight well, and it looked like he built an early lead on the scorecards, as he was noticeably outlanding his opponent. Ortiz did better in the second part of the fight, which was enough in the eyes of one of the judges to score the fight 115-113 in favor of Ortiz, while the other two judges had it a draw, 114-114, ending the fight in a majority draw.

Alexander vs. Berto 
On August 4, 2018, Alexander fought another former world champion in Andre Berto. Alexander, as in his previous fight fought great in the opening rounds and managed to drop Berto in the third round. Berto would, however, be the much better fighter in the later rounds, which earned him the split-decision win, 115-112, 115-12 and 113-114.

Alexander vs. Redkach 
In his next fight, Alexander fought Ivan Redkach. Both fighters fought a solid fight in the opening rounds. In the sixth round, Redkach managed to drop Alexander with a stunning uppercut and left hand. Alexander beat the count, only to be dropped two more times, the second being the final one before the referee waved the fight off, awarding Redkach with the KO victory.

Controversy
In 2015, Alexander publicly took a strong stance against The Supreme Court of the United States of America legitimatizing same-sex marriage in the U.S. and tweeted homophobic statements that were later discussed on boxing articles the next day.

Professional boxing record

References

Further reading

External links

Devon Alexander - Profile, News Archive & Current Rankings at Box.Live

1987 births
African-American boxers
Living people
Boxers from Missouri
Winners of the United States Championship for amateur boxers
American male boxers
World Boxing Council champions
International Boxing Federation champions
World light-welterweight boxing champions
World welterweight boxing champions
21st-century African-American sportspeople